Norberto Brian Torres (born January 12, 1990) is a Canadian-born Filipino professional basketball player for the Rain or Shine Elasto Painters of the Philippine Basketball Association (PBA).

High school career

Torres attended his secondary education at Blessed Mother Teresa Catholic Secondary School in Scarborough, Ontario, Canada.

College career

Torres played college basketball for the De La Salle Green Archers in the UAAP. He was recruited out of high school in Canada and spent three years of residency before suiting up for the Green Archers in 2011. The next year (his second playing year in UAAP), he was the Archers' starting center, often paired with Fil-German center Arnold Van Opstal. With him and Van Opstal in the pivot spot manning the boards, they clinched the UAAP championship in 2013.

Amateur career

In compliance with PBA D-League requirement for incoming PBA rookies, Torres suited up for the Cebuana Lhuillier Gems.

Professional career

Torres was drafted 8th overall by the Star Hotshots in the 2015 PBA draft. In May 2016, Torres was traded by Star to Phoenix Fuel Masters in a three-team trade that also involved GlobalPort Batang Pier.

PBA career statistics

As of the end of 2021 season

Season-by-season averages

|-
| align=left rowspan=2| 
| align=left | Star
| rowspan=2|27 || rowspan=2|9.9 || rowspan=2|.529 || rowspan=2|.536 || rowspan=2|.727 || rowspan=2|2.3 || rowspan=2|.2 || rowspan=2|.1 || rowspan=2|.2 || rowspan=2|3.6
|-
| align=left | Phoenix
|-
| align=left | 
| align=left | Phoenix
| 24 || 14.7 || .357 || .107 || .600 || 4.3 || .4 || .2 || .5 || 3.5
|-
| align=left rowspan=2| 
| align=left | TNT
| rowspan=2|31 || rowspan=2|12.0 || rowspan=2|.387 || rowspan=2|.227 || rowspan=2|.594 || rowspan=2|3.5 || rowspan=2|.4 || rowspan=2|.3 || rowspan=2|.5 || rowspan=2|3.9
|-
| align=left | Rain or Shine
|-
| align=left | 
| align=left | Rain or Shine
| 45 || 14.1 || .377 || .306 || .727 || 2.4 || .6 || .2 || .4 || 5.2
|-
| align=left | 
| align=left | Rain or Shine
| 12 || 12.4 || .413 || .300 || .737 || 3.7 || .3 || .3 || .4 || 4.8
|-
| align=left | 
| align=left | Rain or Shine
| 23 || 14.4 || .434 || .302 || .792 || 2.8 || .6 || .2 || .5 || 5.1
|-
| align=left | 
| align=left | Rain or Shine
| 31 || 14.4 || .468 || .416 || .634 || 2.8 || .6 || .2 || .3 || 6.5
|- class=sortbottom
| align=center colspan=2 | Career
| 193 || 13.2 || .417 || .321 || .675 || 3.0 || .5 || .2 || .4 || 4.7

International career

He was part of the Nokia-RP Youth team that won the Juniors SEABA title in 2008, and was named the tournament MVP.  In 2015, he was a member of the 12-man Sinag Pilipinas lineup that competed in the 2015 Southeast Asian Games and 2015 SEABA Championship, both held in Singapore, where they won gold medals in both occasions.

Personal life

Norbert's parents, Cirilo and Dinia Torres (née dela Cruz) both hail from Calumpit, Bulacan.

References

1990 births
Living people
Basketball players from Toronto
Canadian men's basketball players
Canadian sportspeople of Filipino descent
Centers (basketball)
Magnolia Hotshots players
Philippine Basketball Association All-Stars
Philippines men's national basketball team players
Filipino men's basketball players
Phoenix Super LPG Fuel Masters players
Power forwards (basketball)
Rain or Shine Elasto Painters players
Southeast Asian Games gold medalists for the Philippines
Southeast Asian Games medalists in basketball
TNT Tropang Giga players
De La Salle Green Archers basketball players
Competitors at the 2015 Southeast Asian Games
Magnolia Hotshots draft picks
Citizens of the Philippines through descent